Michael Adolf von Althann, alternatively written Altheimb, (1574–1638) was an Austrian military commander and diplomat.

Early life
Michael Adolf was the eldest son of Christoph Baron von Althann auf Goldburg und Murstetten (1541-1589) and his second wife Elisabeth Baroness Teuffel von Gundersdorff (1548-1577).

Military career
He particularly distinguished himself in the Long Turkish War, at Székesfehérvár and Esztergom. At the end of the war he was appointed field marshal. On 14 June 1610 he was made an Imperial Count. He was later sent on diplomatic missions to the Principality of Transylvania and the Sublime Porte. In 1625 he became the first grand master of the short-lived order of knighthood Militia Christiana, of which he was a founder. He died in Vienna on 7 May 1636.

Personal life
In 1606 he married Baroness Elisabeth von Stotzingen, daughter of Baron Rudolf von Stotzingen (died in 1604), governor of Lower Austria; in 1627 he married Maria Eva von Sternberg (1605-1668). He left issue from both marriages.

References

1574 births
1636 deaths
Generals of the Holy Roman Empire
People of the Long Turkish War